The information regarding fjords, channels, sound and straits of Chile on this page is compiled from the data supplied by the National Geospatial-Intelligence Agency, Country Files (GNS).

Content
This list contains only:
 Listnr - List number (Wikipedia intern)
 Full name - reversed generic. The full name is the complete name that identifies a named feature. The full name is output in reversed generic, "Desertores, Canal" as stored in the database, as opposed to the reading order, "Canal Desertores".
 Latitude of the feature in ± decimal degrees
 Longitude of the feature in  ± decimal degrees
 Unique Feature Identifier (UFI) is a number which uniquely identifies a Geoname feature. Same UFI means same feature.
 FDC is the Feature Designation Code
 Other names listed by NGA for the same feature

This list doesn't include Chilean claims in the Antarctica.

NGA lists 1447 names for 838 features with generics like "Fiordo", "Seno", "Canal", "Paso", "Bahía", "Brazo", "Estrecho", "Ensenada", "Estero". This compilation moved repeated UFIs to the last column of the first name given by NGA.

NGA gives following definition of the features in Feature Designation Code:
CHNM, marine channel, that part of a body of water deep enough for navigation through an area otherwise not suitable
CHNN, navigation channel, a buoyed channel of sufficient depth for the safe navigation of vessels
STRT, strait, a relatively narrow waterway, usually narrower and less extensive than a sound, connecting two larger bodies of water
FJD(S), fjord(s), a long, narrow, steep-walled, deep-water arm(s) of the sea at high latitudes, usually along mountainous coasts
SD,   sound, a long arm of the sea forming a channel between the mainland and an island or islands; or connecting two larger bodies of water

Although some features are called "Bahía", the designation code "BAY" was not selected.

More information
For more information about the feature search in GeoNames Search, using the Unique Feature Identifier (UFI) in the "Advanced Search" Form.

Overview

List of fjords, channels, sounds and straits of Chile

See also
 List of islands of Chile
 Drake Passage
 Guía Narrows
 Primera Angostura
 Segunda Angostura

References

External links
 
 
 
 
 United States Hydrographic Office, South America Pilot (1916)

Chile
Fjords

Geography of Chile